The 2014 Campeonato Carioca de Futebol (officially the 2014 Cariocão Guaraviton for sponsorship reasons) was the 113th edition of the top tier football of FFERJ (Federação de Futebol do Estado do Rio de Janeiro, or Rio de Janeiro State Football Federation). The top four teams advanced to the  2015 Copa do Brasil.

This edition was contested as a single round-robin, Guanabara Cup, followed by a semifinal and final. After each of the 16 teams had played each other once, the four best placed teams advanced to the semifinals.

Participating teams

First phase (Taça Guanabara)

Final Stage

Semi-finals

First leg

Second leg

Finals

References

External links

Campeonato Carioca seasons
Carioca